There have been 15 head coaches for the Green Bay Packers, a professional American football team of the National Football League (NFL). The franchise was founded in 1919 by Curly Lambeau and George Whitney Calhoun and competed for two years against teams around Wisconsin and Michigan before entering into the American Professional Football Association, which is now known as the NFL. During this time, Lambeau served as team captain, a position that more closely matched the modern head coach position. Willard Ryan and Joseph Merrill Hoeffel both served as the official head coach in the early 1920s, however based on the roles of head coach and team captain, the Packers recognize Lambeau as the first coach.

Lambeau is the franchise leader in career games (334) and career wins (209), while Lombardi has the best winning percentage (.754). Ray (Scooter) McLean has the worst winning percentage (.077). Four Packers coaches—Lambeau, Lombardi, Bart Starr and Forrest Gregg—have been elected into the Pro Football Hall of Fame, although Starr and Gregg are recognized as players. Lombardi and Lindy Infante have both been named the league's coach of the year by major news organizations.

The current head coach is Matt LaFleur, who was named to that position in January 2019 after Mike McCarthy was fired.

Key

Coaches
Note: Statistics correct through November 19, 2022.

References
General

 
 
 
 

Specific

 
Green Bay Packers
head coaches